The Tron Church at Kelvingrove is a 19th-century church located in the Kelvingrove neighbourhood in the West End of Glasgow, and formerly known as Henry Wood Hall when it was the home of the Royal Scottish National Orchestra from 1979-2012. Originally the home of a Congregational church, the building is now used by an evangelical Presbyterian fellowship.

History
The building was founded as the Trinity Congregational Church. Originally designed by John Honeyman and completed in 1864, it is a distinctive feature on the landscape with its Gothic Revival spire.

Former Henry Wood Hall

In 1979, the redesign of the Trinity Church in Claremont Street gave the SNO a permanent home of its own: the SNO Centre and Sir Henry Wood Hall.

The building was the main base, rehearsal and recording studio for the Royal Scottish National Orchestra, Scotland's national symphony orchestra, for over thirty years until its 2015 move to the RSNO centre within the Glasgow Royal Concert Hall, where most of its performances in the city now take place. The SNO originally played in Glasgow's St Andrew's Hall, until that building was destroyed by fire in 1962. The orchestra then played in a series of venues of varying suitability. In 1979, the redesign of the Trinity Church in Claremont Street gave the SNO a permanent home of its own: the SNO Centre and Sir Henry Wood Hall.

The RSNO moved to a purpose-built extension at the Glasgow Royal Concert Hall in November 2015, although Henry Wood Hall had been put up for sale in mid-2012.

The Tron at Kelvingrove

After the RSNO moved out of Henry Wood Hall, the congregation of the Tron Church at Bath Street (previously based at St George's Tron Church in Buchanan Street before a schism over attitudes towards same-sex marriages among members of the clergy in 2012) purchased the building and put it back into use as a place of worship, now called The Tron at Kelvingrove.

References

Category B listed buildings in Glasgow
Concert halls in Scotland
Gothic Revival architecture in Scotland
1864 establishments in Scotland
Churches completed in 1864
Churches in Glasgow